Kemijärven Kiekko (KeKi) is a Finnish ice hockey club from Kemijärvi. The club was founded in 1978, and currently plays in the 2. Divisioona.

External links 
 

Ice hockey teams in Finland
Kemijärvi